Vishun Roy College VRC (abbreviated VR College, also known as Bishun Rai College) is an Educational institute in Bihar state of India. It is located in Kiratpur Raja Ram of Vaishali district. Which was established in year 1984 by an famous statesman Shri Rajdeo Roy

Establishment 
The college was established in 1997–1998. The Chairman Is Shri Radeo Babu  The college is named after his father.

Examination success 
Soon after its establishment, VR college became famous for its high success rate in Class XII exams. In 2014, seven out of the Bihar's top 10 were from this college. Because of its "stellar record" the college attracted students from far-off districts.

Since 2014, the college has faced allegations of irregularities. Lalkeshwar Prasad Singh, the chairman of the Bihar School Examination Board (BSEB) was suspected of favouring the college.

When allegations of irregularities surfaced, he formed a judicial committee for investigation, but did not inform the state's education department.

2016 Temporarily de-recognition 

On 28 May 2016, the BSEB publicly declared the intermediate results, however it released its official merit list for 10 May 2016 itself but due to some issues, it made the results public to a later date. VR College students emerged as toppers in both arts and science streams in Class XII exams. Student Ruby Rai topped arts stream with 89% marks, while student Saurabh Shresth topped science stream with 97% marks. Rahul Kumar, another science student of VR College, obtained the third highest marks in the state. Around 1,323,000 students had appeared for the exams: no other student had scored more than 90% marks.

When interviewed by the Aaj Tak TV channel, Ruby Rai and Saurabh Shresth were unable to answer basic questions. The science topper Saurabh Shresth could not describe the link between water and H2O (the chemical formula for water). He also wrongly named aluminium as the most reactive element.

After the video of their interviews became popular, the BSEB asked them and other toppers to appear before a team of experts for a test. Saurabh Shresth and Rahul Kumar of VR College failed in this test. Ruby Rai did not appear for the test, citing poor health. The Board subsequently de-recognized VR College temporarily and 'it was told by the board that the college will be get affiliation after court makes Judgement and approve them to take affiliation.', and ordered an inquiry into the irregularities.

On 8 June 2016, the BSEB chairman Lalkeshwar Prasad Singh resigned after being served a show-cause notice by the Bihar state's education department. On 25 June, Ruby Rai appeared before BSEB team for re-evaluation, and failed to answer a single question correctly. She was subsequently arrested.

References 

Universities and colleges in Vaishali district
Education controversies in India
Educational institutions established in 1997
1997 establishments in Bihar